The 1948 United States presidential election in Utah was held on November 2, 1948 as part of the 1948 United States presidential election. State voters chose four electors to the Electoral College, who voted for president and vice president.

Utah was won by Democratic Party candidate Harry S. Truman, who carried the state with 53.98 percent of the popular vote and winning its four electoral votes. , this is the last election in which Davis County and Uintah County voted for a Democratic presidential candidate.

This was the last election in which Utah voted more Democratic than the nation. After 1948, the state would shift strongly toward the Republican Party, only backing the Democratic presidential nominee once more, during Lyndon B. Johnson's 1964 landslide, and in many election cycles afterward being the most Republican state in the nation.

Results

Results by county

See also
 United States presidential elections in Utah

References

Utah
1948
1948 Utah elections